John Wells (1859 – April 18, 1929) was an American rower who competed in the 1904 Summer Olympics. In 1904 he won the bronze medal in the double sculls, with his partner Joseph Ravannack.

References

External links
John Wells' profile at Sports Reference.com

1859 births
1929 deaths
American male rowers
Rowers at the 1904 Summer Olympics
Olympic bronze medalists for the United States in rowing
Medalists at the 1904 Summer Olympics